Richard Franklin Lennox Thomas Pryor Sr. (December 1, 1940 – December 10, 2005) was an American stand-up comedian and actor. He reached a broad audience with his trenchant observations and storytelling style, and is widely regarded as one of the greatest and most influential stand-up comedians of all time. Pryor won a Primetime Emmy Award and five Grammy Awards. He received the first Kennedy Center Mark Twain Prize for American Humor in 1998. He won the Writers Guild of America Award in 1974. He was listed at number one on Comedy Central's list of all-time greatest stand-up comedians. In 2017, Rolling Stone ranked him first on its list of the 50 best stand-up comics of all time.

Pryor's body of work includes the concert films and recordings: Richard Pryor: Live & Smokin' (1971), That Nigger's Crazy (1974), ...Is It Something I Said? (1975), Bicentennial Nigger (1976), Richard Pryor: Live in Concert (1979), Richard Pryor: Live on the Sunset Strip (1982), and Richard Pryor: Here and Now (1983). As an actor, he starred mainly in comedies. His occasional roles in dramas included Paul Schrader's Blue Collar (1978). He also appeared in action films, like Superman III (1983). He collaborated on many projects with actor Gene Wilder, including the films Silver Streak (1976), Stir Crazy (1980), See No Evil, Hear No Evil (1989), and Another You (1991).

Early life
Pryor was born on December 1, 1940, in Peoria, Illinois. He grew up in a brothel run by his grandmother, Marie Carter, where his alcoholic mother, Gertrude L. (née Thomas), was a prostitute. His father, LeRoy "Buck Carter" Pryor (June 7, 1915 – September 27, 1968), was a former boxer, hustler and pimp. After Gertrude abandoned him when he was 10, Pryor was raised primarily by Marie, a tall, violent woman who would beat him for any of his eccentricities. Pryor was one of four children raised in his grandmother's brothel. He was sexually abused at age seven, and expelled from school at the age of 14. While in Peoria, he became a Prince Hall Freemason at a local lodge.

Pryor served in the U.S. Army from 1958 to 1960, but spent virtually the entire stint in an army prison. According to a 1999 profile about Pryor in The New Yorker, Pryor was incarcerated for an incident that occurred while he was stationed in West Germany. Angered that a white soldier was overly amused at the racially charged scenes of Douglas Sirk's film Imitation of Life, Pryor and several other black soldiers beat and stabbed him, although not fatally.

Career

1960s

In 1963, Pryor moved to New York City and began performing regularly in clubs alongside performers such as Bob Dylan and Woody Allen. On one of his first nights, he opened for singer and pianist Nina Simone at New York's Village Gate. Simone recalls Pryor's bout of performance anxiety:

Inspired by Bill Cosby, Pryor began as a middlebrow comic, with material less controversial than what was to come. He began appearing regularly on television variety shows such as The Ed Sullivan Show, The Merv Griffin Show, and The Tonight Show Starring Johnny Carson. His popularity led to success as a comic in Las Vegas. The first five tracks on the 2005 compilation CD Evolution/Revolution: The Early Years (1966–1974), recorded in 1966 and 1967, capture Pryor in this period.  In 1966, Pryor was a guest star on an episode of The Wild Wild West.

In September 1967, Pryor had what he described in his autobiography Pryor Convictions (1995) as an "epiphany". He walked onto the stage at the Aladdin Hotel in Las Vegas (with Dean Martin in the audience), looked at the sold-out crowd, exclaimed over the microphone, "What the fuck am I doing here!?", and walked off the stage. Afterward, Pryor began working profanity into his act, including the word nigger. His first comedy recording, the eponymous 1968 debut release on the Dove/Reprise label, captures this particular period, tracking the evolution of Pryor's routine. Around this time, his parents died—his mother in 1967 and his father in 1968.

In 1969, Pryor moved to Berkeley, California, where he immersed himself in the counterculture and met people like Huey P. Newton and Ishmael Reed.

1970s
In the 1970s, Pryor wrote for television shows such as Sanford and Son, The Flip Wilson Show, and a 1973 Lily Tomlin special, for which he shared an Emmy Award. During this period, Pryor tried to break into mainstream television. He appeared in several films, including Lady Sings the Blues (1972), The Mack (1973), Uptown Saturday Night (1974), Silver Streak (1976), Car Wash (1976), Bingo Long Traveling All-Stars & Motor Kings (1976), Which Way Is Up? (1977), Greased Lightning (1977), Blue Collar (1978), and The Muppet Movie (1979).

Pryor signed with the comedy-oriented independent record label Laff Records in 1970, and in 1971 recorded his second album, Craps (After Hours). Two years later Pryor, still relatively unknown, appeared in the documentary Wattstax (1972), wherein he riffed on the tragic-comic absurdities of race relations in Watts and the United States. Not long afterward, Pryor sought a deal with a larger label, and he signed with Stax Records in 1973. When his third, breakthrough album, That Nigger's Crazy (1974), was released, Laff, which claimed ownership of Pryor's recording rights, almost succeeded in getting an injunction to prevent the album from being sold. Negotiations led to Pryor's release from his Laff contract. In return for this concession, Laff was enabled to release previously unissued material, recorded between 1968 and 1973, at will. That Nigger's Crazy was a commercial and critical success; it was eventually certified gold by the RIAA and won the Grammy Award for Best Comedy Album at the 1975 Grammy Awards.

During the legal battle, Stax briefly closed its doors. At this time, Pryor returned to Reprise/Warner Bros. Records, which re-released That Nigger's Crazy, immediately after ...Is It Something I Said?, his first album with his new label. Like That Nigger's Crazy, the album was a critical success; it was eventually certified platinum by the RIAA and won the Grammy Award for Best Comedy Recording at the 1976 Grammy Awards.

Pryor's 1976 release Bicentennial Nigger continued his streak of success. It became his third consecutive gold album, and he collected his third consecutive Grammy for Best Comedy Recording for the album in 1977. With every successful album Pryor recorded for Warner (or later, his concert films and his 1980 freebasing accident), Laff published an album of older material to capitalize on Pryor's growing fame—a practice they continued until 1983. The covers of Laff albums tied in thematically with Pryor films, such as Are You Serious? for Silver Streak (1976), The Wizard of Comedy for his appearance in The Wiz (1978), and Insane for Stir Crazy (1980).

Pryor co-wrote Blazing Saddles (1974), directed by Mel Brooks and starring Gene Wilder. Pryor was to play the lead role of Bart, but the film's production studio would not insure him, and Mel Brooks chose Cleavon Little instead.

In 1975, Pryor was a guest host on the first season of Saturday Night Live (SNL) and the first black person to host the show. Pryor's longtime girlfriend, actress and talk-show host Kathrine McKee (sister of Lonette McKee), made a brief guest appearance with Pryor on SNL. One of the highlights of the night was the controversial "word association" skit with Chevy Chase. He would later do his own variety show, The Richard Pryor Show, which premiered on NBC in 1977. The show was cancelled after only four episodes probably because television audiences did not respond well to his show's controversial subject matter, and Pryor was unwilling to alter his material for network censors. He later said, "They offered me ten episodes, but I said all I wanted to in four." During the short-lived series, he portrayed the first black President of the United States, spoofed the Star Wars Mos Eisley cantina, examined gun violence in a non-comedy skit, lampooned racism on the sinking Titanic and used costumes and visual distortion to appear nude.

In 1979, at the height of his success, Pryor visited Kenya. Upon returning to the United States from Africa, Pryor swore he would never use the word "nigger" in his stand-up comedy routine again.

1980s

In 1980, Pryor became the first black actor to earn a million dollars for a single film when he was hired to star in Stir Crazy.  While on a freebasing binge during the making of the film, Pryor doused himself in rum and set himself on fire. Pryor incorporated a description of the incident into his comedy show Richard Pryor: Live on the Sunset Strip (1982). He joked that the event was caused by dunking a cookie into a glass of low-fat and pasteurized milk, causing an explosion. At the end of the bit, he poked fun at people who told jokes about it by waving a lit match and saying, "What's that? Richard Pryor running down the street."

Before the freebasing incident, Pryor was about to start filming Mel Brooks' History of the World, Part I (1981), but was replaced at the last minute by Gregory Hines. Likewise, Pryor was scheduled for an appearance on The Muppet Show at that time, which forced the producers to cast their British writer, Chris Langham, as the guest star for that episode instead.

After his "final performance", Pryor did not stay away from stand-up comedy for long. Within a year, he filmed and released a new concert film and accompanying album, Richard Pryor: Here and Now (1983), which he directed himself. He wrote and directed a fictionalized account of his life, Jo Jo Dancer, Your Life Is Calling, which revolved around the 1980 freebasing incident.

In 1983 Pryor signed a five-year contract with Columbia Pictures for $40 million and he started his own production company, Indigo Productions. Softer, more formulaic films followed, including Superman III (1983), which earned Pryor $4 million; Brewster's Millions (1985), Moving (1988), and See No Evil, Hear No Evil (1989). The only film project from this period that recalled his rough roots was Pryor's semiautobiographic debut as a writer-director, Jo Jo Dancer, Your Life Is Calling, which was not a major success.

Pryor was also originally considered for the role of Billy Ray Valentine on Trading Places (1983), before Eddie Murphy won the part.

Despite his reputation for constantly using profanity on and off camera, Pryor briefly hosted a children's show on CBS called Pryor's Place (1984). Like Sesame Street (where Pryor appeared in a few oft-repeated segments), Pryor's Place featured a cast of puppets (animated by Sid and Marty Krofft), hanging out and having fun in a friendly inner-city environment along with several children and characters portrayed by Pryor himself. Its theme song was performed by Ray Parker Jr. Pryor's Place frequently dealt with more sobering issues than Sesame Street. It was cancelled shortly after its debut.

Pryor co-hosted the Academy Awards twice and was nominated for an Emmy for a guest role on the television series Chicago Hope. Network censors had warned Pryor about his profanity for the Academy Awards, and after a slip early in the program, a five-second delay was instituted when returning from a commercial break. Pryor is one of only three Saturday Night Live hosts to be subjected to a rare five-second delay for his 1975 appearance (along with Sam Kinison in 1986 and Andrew Dice Clay in 1990).

Pryor developed a reputation for being demanding and disrespectful on film sets, and for making selfish and difficult requests. In his autobiography Kiss Me Like a Stranger, co-star Gene Wilder says that Pryor was frequently late to the set during filming of Stir Crazy, and that he demanded, among other things, a helicopter to fly him to and from set because he was the star. Pryor was accused of using allegations of on-set racism to force the hand of film producers into giving him more money:

Pryor appeared in Harlem Nights (1989), a comedy-drama crime film starring three generations of black comedians (Pryor, Eddie Murphy, and Redd Foxx).

1990s and 2000s
In his later years starting in the early to mid-1990s, Pryor used a power-operated mobility scooter due to multiple sclerosis (MS).  To him, MS stood for "More Shit". He appears on the scooter in his last film appearance, a small role in David Lynch's Lost Highway (1997) playing an auto-repair garage manager named Arnie.

Rhino Records remastered all of Pryor's Reprise and WB albums for inclusion in the box set ... And It's Deep Too! The Complete Warner Bros. Recordings (1968–1992) (2000).

In December 1999, Pryor appeared in the cold open of The Norm Show in the episode entitled "Norm vs. The Boxer". He played Mr. Johnson, an elderly man in a wheelchair who has lost the rights to in-home nursing when he kept attacking the nurses before attacking Norm himself. This was his last television appearance.

In 2002, Pryor and Jennifer Lee Pryor, his wife and manager, won legal rights to all the Laff material, which amounted to almost 40 hours of reel-to-reel analog tape. After going through the tapes and getting Richard's blessing, Jennifer Lee Pryor gave Rhino Records access to the tapes in 2004. These tapes, including the entire Craps (After Hours) album, form the basis of the February 1, 2005, double-CD release Evolution/Revolution: The Early Years (1966–1974).

Legacy 

Jerry Seinfeld called Pryor "the Picasso of our profession" and Bob Newhart heralded Pryor as "the seminal comedian of the last 50 years". Dave Chappelle said of Pryor, "You know those, like, evolution charts of man? He was the dude walking upright. Richard was the highest evolution of comedy." This legacy can be attributed, in part, to the unusual degree of intimacy Pryor brought to bear on his comedy.  As Bill Cosby reportedly once said, "Richard Pryor drew the line between comedy and tragedy as thin as one could possibly paint it."

Awards and honors

In 1998, Pryor won the first Mark Twain Prize for American Humor from the John F. Kennedy Center for the Performing Arts. According to former Kennedy Center President Lawrence J. Wilker, Pryor was selected as the first recipient of the Prize because: 

In 2004, Pryor was voted number one on Comedy Central's list of the 100 Greatest Stand-ups of All Time. In a 2005 British poll to find "The Comedian's Comedian," Pryor was voted the 10th-greatest comedy act ever by fellow comedians and comedy insiders.

Pryor was posthumously awarded the Grammy Lifetime Achievement Award in 2006.

The animal rights organization PETA gives out an award in Pryor's name to people who have done outstanding work to alleviate animal suffering. Pryor was active in animal rights and was deeply concerned about the plight of elephants in circuses and zoos. In 1999, he was awarded a Humanitarian Award by the group, and worked with them on campaigns against the treatment of birds by KFC.

Artist Preston Jackson created a life-sized bronze statue in dedication to the beloved comedian and named it Richard Pryor: More than Just a Comedian. It was placed at the corner of State and Washington Streets in downtown Peoria, on May 1, 2015, close to the neighborhood in which he grew up with his mother. The unveiling was held Sunday, May 3, 2015.

In a Netflix special released in May 2022, The Hall: Honoring the Greats of Stand-Up inducted Richard Pryor into the National Comedy Center in
Jamestown, New York.

Retrospectives
In 2002, a television documentary entitled The Funny Life of Richard Pryor depicted Pryor's life and career. Broadcast in the UK as part of the Channel 4 series Kings of Black Comedy, it was produced, directed and narrated by David Upshal and featured rare clips from Pryor's 1960s stand-up appearances and films such as Silver Streak (1976), Blue Collar (1978), Richard Pryor: Live in Concert (1978), and Stir Crazy (1980). Contributors included George Carlin, Dave Chappelle, Whoopi Goldberg, Ice-T, Paul Mooney, Joan Rivers, and Lily Tomlin. The show tracked down the two cops who had rescued Pryor from his "freebasing incident", former managers, and even school friends from Pryor's home town of Peoria, Illinois. In the US, the show went out as part of the Heroes of Black Comedy series on Comedy Central, narrated by Don Cheadle.

A television documentary, Richard Pryor: I Ain't Dead Yet, #*%$#@!! (2003) consisted of archival footage of Pryor's performances and testimonials from fellow comedians, including Dave Chappelle, Denis Leary, Chris Rock, and Wanda Sykes, on Pryor's influence on comedy.

On December 19, 2005, BET aired a Pryor special, titled The Funniest Man Dead or Alive. It included commentary from fellow comedians, and insight into his upbringing.

A retrospective of Pryor's film work, concentrating on the 1970s, titled A Pryor Engagement, opened at Brooklyn Academy of Music Cinemas for a two-week run in February 2013. Several prolific comedians who have claimed Pryor as an influence include George Carlin, Dave Attell, Martin Lawrence, Dave Chappelle, Chris Rock, Colin Quinn, Patrice O'Neal, Bill Hicks, Jerry Seinfeld, Jon Stewart, Bill Burr, Joey Diaz, Eddie Murphy, Louis C.K., and Eddie Izzard.

On May 31, 2013, Showtime debuted the documentary Richard Pryor: Omit the Logic directed by Emmy Award-winning filmmaker Marina Zenovich. The executive producers were Pryor's widow Jennifer Lee Pryor and Roy Ackerman. Interviewees included Dave Chappelle, Whoopi Goldberg, Jesse Jackson, Quincy Jones, George Lopez, Bob Newhart, Richard Pryor, Jr., Lily Tomlin, and Robin Williams.

On March 12, 2019, Paramount Network debuted the documentary I Am Richard Pryor, directed by Jesse James Miller. The film included appearances by Sandra Bernhard, Lily Tomlin, Mike Epps, Howie Mandel, and Pryor's ex-wife, Jennifer Lee Pryor, among others. Jennifer Lee served as an executive producer on the film.

Portrayals 
In the episode "Taxes and Death or Get Him to the Sunset Strip"(2012), the voice of Richard Pryor is played by Eddie Griffin in the satirical TV show Black Dynamite.

A planned biopic, entitled Richard Pryor: Is It Something I Said?, was being produced by Chris Rock and Adam Sandler. The film would have starred Marlon Wayans as the young Pryor. Other actors previously attached include Mike Epps and Eddie Murphy. The film would have been directed by Bill Condon and was still in development with no release date, as of February 2013.

The biopic remained in limbo, and went through several producers until it was announced in January 2014 that it was being backed by The Weinstein Company with Lee Daniels as director. It was further announced, in August 2014, that the biopic will have Oprah Winfrey as producer and will star Mike Epps as Pryor.

He is portrayed by Brandon Ford Green in Season 1 Episode 4 "Sugar and Spice" of Showtime's I'm Dying Up Here.

In the Epic Rap Battles of History episode George Carlin vs. Richard Pryor, Pryor was portrayed by American rapper Zeale.

Influences 
Pryor's influences included Charlie Chaplin, Jackie Gleason, Red Skelton, Abbott and Costello, Jerry Lewis, Dean Martin, Jack Benny, Bob Hope, Woody Allen, Dick Gregory, Bill Cosby, Redd Foxx, and Lenny Bruce.

Personal life
Pryor met actress Pam Grier through comedian Freddie Prinze. They began dating when they were both cast in Greased Lightning (1977). Grier helped Pryor learn to read and tried to help him with his drug addiction. Pryor married another woman while dating Grier.

Pryor dated actress Margot Kidder during the filming of Some Kind of Hero (1982). Kidder stated that she "fell in love with Pryor in two seconds flat" after they first met.

Marriages 
Pryor was married seven times to five women:

 Patricia Price, to whom he was married 1960–1961.
 Shelley Bonus, to whom he was married 1967–1969.
 Deborah McGuire, an aspiring model and actress whom he married on September 22, 1977. They dated on and off for four years prior to their marriage. They separated in January 1978, and their divorce was finalized in August 1978.
 Jennifer Lee, an actress and interior designer whom Pryor had hired to decorate his home. They married in August 1981, and divorced in October 1982 due to his drug addiction. They remarried on June 29, 2001, and remained married until Pryor's death in 2005.
 Flynn Belaine, an aspiring actress whom he married in October 1986. They met when Pryor was performing in Washington, D.C., in 1984. Two months after they married, Pryor filed for divorce, but withdrew the petition the same day. A week later he filed for divorce again. Their divorce was finalized in July 1987. They remarried on April 1, 1990, but divorced again in July 1991.

Children 
Pryor had seven children with six different women:
 Renee Pryor, born July 20, 1957; mother, Pryor's girlfriend named Susan, when Pryor was 16.
 Richard Pryor Jr., born April 10, 1962; mother, Pryor's first wife, Patricia Price.
 Elizabeth Anne, born April 24, 1967; mother, Pryor's girlfriend, Maxine Anderson.
 Rain Pryor, born July 16, 1969; mother, Pryor's second wife, Shelley Bonus.
 Steven, born November 14, 1984; mother, Flynn Belaine, who later became Pryor's fifth wife.
 Franklin, born April 29, 1987; mother, Pryor's girlfriend, Geraldine Mason.
 Kelsey, born October 25, 1987; mother, Pryor's fifth wife, Flynn Belaine.

Sexuality 
Nine years after Pryor's death, in 2014, the biographical book Becoming Richard Pryor by Scott Saul stated that Pryor "acknowledged his bisexuality"; and, in 2018, Quincy Jones and Pryor's widow Jennifer Lee stated that Pryor had a sexual relationship with actor Marlon Brando, and that Pryor was open with his friends about his bisexuality and the fact that he slept with men. Pryor's daughter Rain later disputed the claim, to which Lee stated that Rain was in denial about her father's bisexuality. 

Lee later told the Hollywood entertainment television series TMZ on TV that, "it was the '70s! Drugs were still good...If you did enough cocaine, you'd fuck a radiator and send it flowers in the morning." 

In his autobiography Pryor Convictions, Pryor talked about having a two-week relationship with Mitrasha, a trans woman, which he called "two weeks of being gay". 

In his first special, Live & Smokin', Pryor discusses performing fellatio, and in 1977, he said at a gay rights show at the Hollywood Bowl, "I have sucked a dick."

Substance abuse 
Late in the evening of June 9, 1980, Pryor poured 151-proof rum all over himself and lit himself on fire. The Los Angeles police reported he was burned by an explosion while freebasing cocaine. Pryor claimed his injuries were caused by burning rum. While ablaze, he ran down Parthenia Street from his Los Angeles home, until being subdued by police. He was taken to a hospital, where he was treated for second- and third-degree burns covering more than half of his body. Pryor spent six weeks in recovery at the Grossman Burn Center at Sherman Oaks Hospital in Los Angeles. His daughter Rain stated that the incident happened as a result of a bout of drug-induced psychosis.

Pryor's widow Jennifer Lee recalled when he began freebasing cocaine: "After two weeks of watching him getting addicted to this stuff I moved out. It was clear the drug had moved in and it had become his lover and everything. I did not exist."

Health problems 
In November 1977, after many years of heavy smoking and drinking, Pryor had a mild heart attack at age 36. He recovered and resumed performing in January the following year. In 1986, he was diagnosed with multiple sclerosis. In 1990, Pryor had a second heart attack while in Australia. He underwent triple heart bypass surgery in 1991.

In late 2004, his sister said he had lost his voice as a result of his multiple sclerosis. However, on January 9, 2005, Pryor's wife, Jennifer Lee, rebutted this statement in a post on Pryor's official website, citing Richard as saying: "I'm sick of hearing this shit about me not talking ... not true ... I have good days, bad days ... but I still am a talkin' motherfucker!"

Death 
On December 10, 2005, nine days after his 65th birthday, Pryor had a third heart attack in Los Angeles. After his wife's failed attempts to resuscitate him, he was taken to a local hospital, where he was pronounced dead at 7:58 a.m. PST. His widow Jennifer was quoted as saying, "At the end, there was a smile on his face." 

He was cremated, and his ashes were given to his family. His ashes were scattered in the bay at Hana, Hawaii, by his widow in 2019. Forensic pathologist Michael Hunter believes Pryor's fatal heart attack was caused by coronary artery disease that was at least partially brought about by years of tobacco smoking.

Discography

Albums

Compilations 
 1973: Pryor Goes Foxx Hunting (Laff.)
 Split LP with Redd Foxx, containing previously released tracks from Craps (After Hours)
 1975: Down And Dirty (Laff.)
 Split LP with Redd Foxx, containing previously released tracks from Craps (After Hours)
 1976: Richard Pryor Meets ... Richard & Willie And ... The SLA!! (Laff)
 Split LP with black ventriloquist act Richard And Willie, containing previously released tracks from Craps (After Hours)
 1977: Richard Pryor's Greatest Hits (Warner Bros. Records)
 Contains tracks from Craps (After Hours), That Nigger's Crazy, and  ... Is It Something I Said?, plus a previously unreleased track from 1975, "Ali".
 1982: The Very Best of Richard Pryor (Laff.)
 2000: ... And It's Deep Too! The Complete Warner Bros. Recordings (1968–1992) (9-CD box set) (Warner Bros. Records/Rhino)
 Box set collection containing all Warner Bros. albums plus a bonus disc of previously unissued material from 1973 to 1992.
 2002: The Anthology (1968–1992) (2-CD set) (Warner Bros. Records/Rhino, 2002 in music)
 Highlights culled from the albums collected in the ... And It's Deep Too! box set.
 2005: Evolution/Revolution: The Early Years (1966–1974) (2-CD set) (Warner Bros. Records/Rhino, 2005 in music)
 Pryor-authorized compilation of material released on Laff, including the entire Craps (After Hours) album.
 2013: No Pryor Restraint: Life In Concert (7-CD, 2-DVD box set) (Shout! Factory)
 Box set containing concert films, albums and unreleased material from 1966 to 1992.

Filmography

Films

Television

Books

References

Further reading

External links 

 
 
 
  Biographical special—includes full version.

 
1940 births
2005 deaths
20th-century American comedians
20th-century American male actors
20th-century American male writers
20th-century American screenwriters
Actors from Peoria, Illinois
African-American film directors
African-American male actors
African-American male comedians
African-American United States Army personnel
African-American screenwriters
African-American stand-up comedians
African-American television producers
American Freemasons
American humorists
American male comedians
American male comedy actors
American male film actors
American male non-fiction writers
American male screenwriters
American male television writers
American Prince Hall Freemasons
American satirists
American social commentators
American sketch comedians
American stand-up comedians
American television writers
Censorship in the arts
Comedians from Illinois
Deaths from coronary artery disease
Film directors from Illinois
Grammy Lifetime Achievement Award winners
American LGBT actors
LGBT African Americans
Male actors from Illinois
Mark Twain Prize recipients
Military personnel from Illinois
Obscenity controversies in stand-up comedy
People with multiple sclerosis
Race-related controversies in stand-up comedy
Screenwriters from Illinois
Stand-up comedy controversies
Stax Records artists
Television producers from Illinois
United States Army soldiers
Warner Records artists
Writers from Peoria, Illinois